Acerrae Vatriae is mentioned by Pliny the Elder as having been a town of the Sarranates situated in Umbria, but it was already destroyed in his time, and all clue to its position is lost.

References

Roman towns and cities in Italy
Cities and towns in Umbria
Former populated places in Italy